Albert-Ernest Carrier-Belleuse (born Albert-Ernest Carrier de Belleuse; 12 June 1824 – 4 June 1887) was a French sculptor. He was one of the founding members of the Société Nationale des Beaux-Arts, and was made an officer of the Legion of Honour.

Early life
Carrier-Belleuse was born on 12 June 1824 at Anizy-le-Château, Aisne, France. He began his training as a goldsmith's apprentice. Carrier-Belleuse was a student of David d'Angers and briefly studied at the École des Beaux-Arts.  His career is distinguished by his versatility and his work outside France:  in England between 1850 and 1855 (working for Mintons), and in Brussels around 1871.  His name is perhaps best known because Auguste Rodin worked as his assistant between 1864 and 1870. The two travelled to Brussels in 1871, and by some accounts Rodin assisted Carrier-Belleuse's architectural sculpture for the Brussels Stock Exchange.

Career

Carrier-Belleuse made many terra cotta pieces, the most famous of which may be The Abduction of Hippodameia depicting the Greek mythological scene of a centaur kidnapping Hippodameia on her wedding day.  He was made artistic director at the Manufacture nationale de Sèvres in 1876.

Société Nationale des Beaux-Arts
In 1862 Carrier-Belleuse was one of the founding members of the Société Nationale des Beaux-Arts, and was made an officer of the Légion d'honneur. The bronzes he executed prior to 1868 were always signed "Carrier" or "A. Carrier", but after 1868 his signature was changed to "Carrier-Belleuse".

Artistic style
His work encompassed all manner of sculptural subjects and materials, and his naturalism incorporated a breadth of styles: unembellished Realism, neo-Baroque exuberance, and Rococo elegance.

Family
His sons were the painters Louis-Robert Carrier-Belleuse  (1848-1913) and Pierre Carrier-Belleuse (1851-1932).

Death and legacy
Carrier-Belleuse died on 4 June 1887 at Sèvres, France.

Works of art

 Pediment sculpture of Abundance, Pavillon de Flore, South façade of the Great Galerie, Louvre palace, Paris, circa 1863
 Caryatids themed on the four seasons, Vichy Opera, for architect Charles Badger, 1865
 Architectural sculpture for the Tribunal de commerce de Paris (Commercial Court of Paris),  on the Île de la Cité, for architect Antoine-Nicolas Bailly, completed 1865
 A silvered bronze chimney-piece for the Hôtel de la Païva, Paris, 1866
 Monument to André Masséna, Nice, 1869
 Architectural work at the Brussels Stock Exchange, Brussels, circa 1870
 Mary Queen of Scots, Private Collection, ca. 1870
 Two elaborate multifigure torchères for the base of grand staircase, Palais Garnier (Paris Opera), Pairs, 1873
 Tomb of Belgian photographer Louis Ghémar, Laeken Cemetery, Brussels, 1873
 Architectural work for the Théâtre de la Renaissance, Paris, for architect Charles de Lalande, 1873
 Sea Nymph for the fountain at the Place du Theâtre-Français, Paris, for architect Gabriel Davioud, 1874
 Bust of Aimée-Olympe Desclée for her tomb, 1874
 Four Seasons fountain, Hotel de Ville, Fleurance
 Mausoleum of José de San Martín, Buenos Aires Metropolitan Cathedral, Buenos Aires
 Equestrian statue of Mihai Viteazul, University Square, Bucharest, Romania
 Equestrian statue of Manuel Belgrano, Plaza de Mayo Square, Buenos Aires, Argentina
 Equestrian statue of Bernardo O'Higgins, Alameda, Santiago de Chile, Chile
 Statue for the victims of the La Compañía fire, originally at the place of the fire, today in front of the General Cemetery in Santiago de Chile, Chile

Gallery

References

External links

 The R.W. Norton Art Gallery: Albert-Ernest Carrier-Belleuse's Biography
 

1824 births
1887 deaths
People from Aisne
19th-century French painters
French male painters
French architectural sculptors
Officiers of the Légion d'honneur
19th-century French sculptors
French male sculptors
19th-century French male artists